Darien is a city in and the county seat of McIntosh County, Georgia, United States. It is the second oldest planned city in Georgia and was originally called New Inverness. The population of Darien was 1,460 at the 2020 census, down from 1,975 in 2010.

History

Colonial period

The British built Fort King George in 1721, near what would become Darien. At the time it was the southernmost outpost of the British Empire in North America. The fort was abandoned in 1727 following attacks from the Spanish. Its remains constitute the oldest fort on the Georgia coast.

The town of Darien (originally known as "New Inverness") was founded in January 1736 by Scottish Highlanders recruited by James Oglethorpe to act as settler-soldiers protecting the frontiers of Georgia from the Spanish in Florida, the French in the Alabama basin, and the Indian allies of each colonial enterprise. On January 10, 1736, 177 emigrants, including women and children, arrived on the Prince of Wales to establish Darien, which was named after the Darien scheme, a former Scottish colony in Panama. Among the initial settlers was Lachlan McGillivray, who became a noted trader with the Creek people, and Lachlan McIntosh, a leader during the American Revolutionary War.

The Scots originated mainly from around Inverness and consisted of both Jacobite and Hanoverian supporting clans, the majority of whom spoke only Gaelic. When visited by Oglethorpe in February, the settlers had already constructed "a battery of four pieces of cannon, built a guardhouse, a storehouse, a chapel, and several huts for particular people." Darien was laid out in accordance with the now-famous Oglethorpe Plan.

They showed similar progress in the construction of military forts: by March the Scottish settlers had begun work on two forts, Fort St. Andrews on Cumberland Island, and Fort St. George on the St. Johns River,  to the south of the territory claimed by the British government in the Georgia charter.

In 1736, the British abandoned Fort St. George by agreement with the Spanish officials in Florida. In 1736 Darien settlers began work on Fort Frederica on St. Simons Island, a few miles south of Darien, between it and Cumberland Island. Scots settlers whose travel was paid for by the Trustees of the Colony were organized into two companies, the Highland Independent Company of Foot, an infantry force, and the Highland Rangers, a mounted force. By 1737 the constant military activity of the Darien colony was taking its toll. An additional 44 Highland settlers arrived to expand the town.

Initially the settlers' economy was based on the cultivation of crops; however, after the first year, they suffered a succession of poor harvests. They concentrated on rearing cattle and harvesting timber for sale in nearby Savannah.

In 1739 eighteen of the most prominent members of the Darien colony signed the first petition against the introduction of slavery into Georgia, in response to pleas to Oglethorpe and the trustees by inhabitants of Savannah to lift the prohibition of slavery. The Highlanders' petition was successful, but slavery was introduced ten years later in 1749 because the proprietors could not attract enough laborers to make the colony profitable.

Conflicts continued with Spanish and Indian forces during this time. The War of Jenkins' Ear began in October 1739. In November, in response to two Scots garrisoned on Amelia Island being killed in an ambush by Spanish-allied Indians, the Darien settlers mobilized and, together with forces from South Carolina, captured the Spanish forts Picolata, San Francisco de Pupo, San Diego, and Mose, before attempting to lay siege to St. Augustine. The Spanish won the Battle of Fort Mose, resulting in the death or capture of 51 Darien settlers.

After the battle, a number of the settlers abandoned Darien for South Carolina. By 1741 another shipload of 43 colonists had arrived. These colonists received land grants from the trustees which specified that the land was to pass to the male or female descendants of the original recipients, in "Tail General". The trustees were trying to keep settlers in the colony. Previously, all land grants in the American colonies had been granted in "Tail Male", descending to only the male children. The Highland settlers objected to the change, as it went against their traditional patrilineal landholding and inheritance practices. In the future, the majority of Georgia land grants were made in "Tail General".

In January 1775, the city passed a resolution condemning slavery, saying:

Civil War and after

On June 11, 1863, Union troops stationed on St. Simons Island looted and destroyed most of the town, including the homes of black residents, mostly slaves. This was not part of Sherman's March to the Sea, which occurred more than a year later. Confusion has arisen because the St. Simons Island troops were under the command of another General Sherman, stationed in the South Carolina Sea Islands. The destruction of the undefended city, which was of little strategic importance, was carried out by the 54th Massachusetts Volunteers under the command of a reluctant Colonel Robert Gould Shaw and the 2nd South Carolina Volunteers under the command of Colonel James Montgomery. Colonel Montgomery ordered that the town be looted and burned. This was part of the Union strategy to damage the Confederate states' ability to supply food and materiel towards their war effort. Montgomery's troops allegedly broke ranks and looted freely, while Shaw ordered his troops to take only what would be useful at camp. (He later described the raid as a "Satanic action.")

The First African Baptist Church (claimed to be the oldest African American church in the county) was destroyed along with the rest of the town. It was rebuilt, and later some meetings of the 20th-century Civil Rights Movement were held there.

After the U.S. Army destroyed Darien, gunboats were used to blockade the port. The troops plundered residents and plantations of McIntosh County for food, as armies lived off the land to a great extent. The only defenders left in the county were a group of men too old for military service. Union troops found out about the meeting from the local enslaved people. The troops surrounded the church, opened fire, and captured 23 men. These men were marched to a landing near Darien, put on ships, and taken to prisons in the North.

Following the Civil War, Darien was rebuilt, with financial aid coming in small part from the family of Colonel Robert Gould Shaw. He had been killed during the war but had written to his family of his shame in participating in the destruction of it.

Into the early 1900s, Darien was one of the largest Southeastern ports for shipping lumber. When the timber was depleted, Darien became a fishing village, known primarily for Georgia wild shrimp. It was once famous for its oysters.

On September 8, 1930, two African American men, George Grant and Willie Bryan, were lynched by a mob of Darien's residents in the Darien Jail due to the death of Police Chief Robert L. Freeman and the wounding of Deputy Collins and two other officers while trying to capture the two men after a robbery at the Darien Bank. The town was put under martial law by Colonel W.R. Neal of the Georgia militia in response to the mob.

There are 32 markers of historic sites near Darien and 42 markers in McIntosh County. (See the external link for a list.)

Darien in the 21st century has shown signs of growth. This drew off businesses from the city center as development ensued near the I-95 interchange with GA 251. This has resulted in the building of several chain restaurants, gas stations, and hotels, as well as a small outlet mall. But downtown Darien has flourished with an emphasis on its historic heritage and the waterfront. Many new businesses have opened as the city has reclaimed its walking center.

Geography
Darien is located on the southern edge of McIntosh County at  (31.371134, −81.430742). The city is sited on a low bluff overlooking the Darien River, a tidal channel that reaches the Atlantic at Doboy Sound north of the Altamaha.

U.S. Route 17 passes through the center of town, leading north  to Eulonia and south  to Brunswick. Interstate 95 passes through the west side of the city limits, with access from Exit 49 (State Route 250). I-95 leads north  to Savannah and south  to Jacksonville, Florida.

Demographics

2020 census

As of the 2020 United States census, there were 1,460 people, 957 households, and 609 families residing in the city.

2010 census
As of the 2010 United States Census, there were 1,975 people living in the city. The racial makeup of the city was 51.9% White, 44.1% Black, 0.1% Native American, 0.8% Asian, 0.1% Pacific Islander, 0.1% from some other race and 1.1% from two or more races. 1.9% were Hispanic or Latino of any race.

2000 census
As of the census of 2000, there were 1,719 people, 697 households, and 464 families living in the city. The racial makeup of the city was 54.10% White, 43.98% African American, 0.12% Native American, 0.64% Asian, 0.17% Pacific Islander, 0.06% from other races, and 0.93% from two or more races. Hispanic or Latino of any race were 0.64% of the population.

There were 697 households, out of which 30.6% had children under the age of 18 living with them, 42.8% were married couples living together, 18.8% had a female householder with no husband present, and 33.4% were non-families. 30.6% of all households were made up of individuals, and 13.2% had someone living alone who was 65 years of age or older.  The average household size was 2.47 and the average family size was 3.06.

In the city, the population was spread out, with 29.2% under the age of 18, 7.5% from 18 to 24, 25.4% from 25 to 44, 23.5% from 45 to 64, and 14.4% who were 65 years of age or older. The median age was 37 years. For every 100 females, there were 82.5 males. For every 100 females age 18 and over, there were 80.3 males.

The median income for a household in the city was $24,135, and the median income for a family was $28,750. Males had a median income of $26,198 versus $16,897 for females. The per capita income for the city was $11,938.  About 21.3% of families and 24.7% of the population were below the poverty line, including 29.8% of those under age 18 and 25.2% of those ages 65 or over.

Government
The city has changed its form of government to council/manager and has hired a city manager.

Education

McIntosh County School District 
The McIntosh County School District consists of two elementary schools, a middle school, and a high school. The district has 121 full-time teachers and 1,979 students.
Todd Grant Elementary School
McIntosh County Middle School
McIntosh County Academy

Photos

See also
 Vernon Square–Columbus Square Historic District
 West Darien Historic District

References

Further reading
Burchard, Peter (1965) One Gallant Rush St. Martin's Press, New York, NY;
 Parker, A.W. (1997) Scottish Highlanders in Colonial Georgia, The Recruitment, Emigration and Settlement at Darien, 1735–1748 University of Georgia Press, Athens, GA,  ;
 Sullivan, Buddy, ed. The Darien Journal of John Girardeau Legare, Ricegrower (University of Georgia Press; 2010). 168 pages. Journal kept by 1877 migrant from South Carolina, who documents the decline of rice cultivation in tidewater Georgia and the rise of the timber industry.

External links
 
 Darien, Sherpa Guides 
 Fort King George, Georgia State Parks
 Historical markers in McIntosh County, Georgia Info
 The burning of Darien
 "McIntosh County Roadside Historical Markers", Georgia Magazine, December 17, 2005

Cities in Georgia (U.S. state)
Cities in McIntosh County, Georgia
County seats in Georgia (U.S. state)
Brunswick metropolitan area
Scottish-American history
Scottish-American culture in Georgia (U.S. state)
African-American history of Georgia (U.S. state)
Populated places established in 1736